Vestreskorve Glacier is a broad glacier in the Mühlig-Hofmann Mountains, to the south of Breplogen Mountain, which drains from a position opposite the head of Austreskorve Glacier northwestward along the west side of Svarthamaren Mountain. Plotted and named from surveys and air photos by the Norwegian Antarctic Expedition (1956–60).

See also
 List of glaciers in the Antarctic
 Glaciology

References
 

Glaciers of Queen Maud Land
Princess Astrid Coast